Jambegali is a village in the Khanapur taluka of Belgaum district in the southern Indian state of Karnataka. As of the 2019 Indian census, it had a population of 754.

References

Villages in Belagavi district